The Synopsis, also known as the Kievan Synopsis or Kyivan Synopsis is work of history, first published in Kiev in 1674. It interprets history through a Christian conception of time focused on the narratives of creation, fall, and redemption. It also had a political purpose to justify the Treaty of Pereyaslav which annexed the Cossack Hetmanate to the Tsardom of Russia while also claiming a central role for the city of Kiev.

Innokentiy Gizel is generally considered to be the author of Synopsis, however this is arguable. Synopsis was the first textbook on the subject of Russian history written in any Slavic language. It was rather popular until the mid-19th century and survived some thirty editions. 

The book began with the history of the origins and lifestyle of the Slavs and ended with the mid-17th century in the first edition. The second and third editions (1678 and 1680) end with the Chyhyryn Campaigns of 1677-1678. Synopsis covers the history of Kievan Rus', the Mongol invasion of Rus', and the struggles against the Crimean Tatars, Ottoman Turkey, and Poland. The author of the Synopsis asserted that the Russian tsars were the legal successors of the Grand Princes of Kiev. Synopsis is notable since it clearly demonstrates that the idea of uniting all East Slavic people under the authority of one state was born not in Moscow but in the south-western lands of former Kievan Rus' and designed in Kiev. The purpose of the work is to "achieve a precarious balance between glorifying the Muscovite tsar on the one hand and defending Kiev’s own claims to power on the other." The appendix of the Synopsis contains lists of Russian princes, Polish Voivodes in Little Russia, Cossack hetmans, and Kievan metropolitans.

References

Russian non-fiction books
Ukrainian literature
Medieval literature
History textbooks
Books about civilizations
17th-century history books